William of Bures may refer to:

William I of Bures (died 1142)
William II of Bures (died 1158)